Arthur Wellesley may refer to:

Arthur Wellesley, 1st Duke of Wellington (1769–1852), Anglo-Irish soldier and British prime minister
Arthur Wellesley, 2nd Duke of Wellington (1807–1884), British soldier and nobleman
Arthur Wellesley, 4th Duke of Wellington (1849–1934), British soldier and nobleman
Arthur Wellesley, 5th Duke of Wellington (1876–1941), British soldier and nobleman
Arthur Wellesley, Marquess of Douro (born 1978), grandson of the 8th Duke
Arthur Wellesley Hughes (1870–1950), also known as Arthur Wellesley, Canadian musician and composer
Arthur Wellesley, 4th Earl Cowley (1890–1962), British actor and nobleman

See also
 Arthur (disambiguation)
 Wellesley (disambiguation)
 Duke of Wellington (disambiguation)